Charitable Intent is a play by David Williamson.

It was the third in his trilogy of plays about community conferencing, loosely known as "the Jack Manning trilogy" because all three plays feature the character Jack Manning.

References

External links

Plays by David Williamson
2001 plays